Royal Hunt in Ischl (German: Hofjagd in Ischl) is a 1955 Austrian-West German historical comedy film directed by Hans Schott-Schöbinger and starring Elma Karlowa, Herta Staal and Hans von Borsody. It is also known by its West German title Two Hearts and a Throne (German: Zwei Herzen und ein Thron). It was shot at the Sievering Studios in Vienna and on location in the Dachstein Mountains, Hallstatt and Gosau. The film's sets were designed by the art directors Hertha Hareiter and Otto Pischinger.

Cast
 Elma Karlowa as 	Nina Charlotta von Russland	
 Herta Staal as Liesl	
 Hans von Borsody as Eberhard von Preußen
 Margrit Aust as Wirtin zur Goldenen Gans
 Adrienne Gessner as 		Gräfin Lahousen
 Gunther Philipp as Kuno Möslacher		
 Fritz Imhoff	as 	General-Kommandant Köpnick
 Rudolf Vogel as 	 Diener Charles	
 Hans Olden as Graf Turm		
 Herbert Hübner as Petrowsky	
 Arnulf Schröder as 	Herr von Spree
 Rudolf Carl as 	Iwan
 Alfred Neugebauer as 	Oberförster	
 Paul Löwinger as 	Wirt Möslacher Senior
Joseph Egger as 	Peter von der Post

References

Bibliography 
 Fritsche, Maria. Homemade Men in Postwar Austrian Cinema: Nationhood, Genre and Masculinity. Berghahn Books, 2013.

External links 
 

1955 films
1955 comedy films
Austrian comedy films
German comedy films
West German films
1950s German-language films
Films directed by Hans Schott-Schöbinger
1950s German films
Gloria Film films
Films shot at Sievering Studios
Films set in the 19th century
German historical films
Austrian historical films
1950s historical films

de:Zwei Herzen und ein Thron